Konrad Sundlo (born in 1881 in Kristiansand, Norway, died 25 May 1965 on Nesøya, Asker, Norway) was a Norwegian officer and politician in Nasjonal Samling before and during Second World War. 

He was sentenced to life imprisonment during the post-war legal purge in Norway.

Background 
Sundlo was educated as an officer and graduated from the Norwegian Military Academy in 1902. He joined Nasjonal Samling in 1933, and was appointed commander of Infantry Regiment 15 the same year.

Second World War 
When the Germans invaded Norway 9 April 1940, Sundlo held the rank of colonel and was commander-in-chief for Narvik area.

When the Norwegian fascist leader Vidkun Quisling visited Adolf Hitler in Berlin in the autumn of 1939, he had shown the German Führer a letter sent to him by Sundlo, and described the latter as pro-German. This gave the Germans the impression that Sundlo would not oppose a German landing at Narvik. It is not known whether or not Sundlo was aware that Quisling had passed on his letter to the Germans.

During the German occupation Sundlo was Rikshirdsjef (paramilitary collaborationist commander) from the autumn of 1940. After that he served as the collaborationist county governor of Oslo and Akershus from 1943 to 1944 and lastly in Sogn og Fjordane until the end of the war.

After the surrender of Narvik on 9 April 1940, Sundlo was accused of treason by his divisional commander, General Carl Gustav Fleischer. However, the post-war trials only found that Sundlo had committed "negligent offences" at Narvik in 1940. He was still found guilty for a number of other acts during the occupation, and sentenced to life in prison. A minority of three of the eight judges at his trial voted for a death sentence. Konrad Sundlo was pardoned in 1952 and died in 1965.

References

1881 births
1965 deaths
People from Kristiansand
County governors of Norway
Members of Nasjonal Samling
Norwegian Military Academy alumni
Norwegian Army personnel of World War II
Norwegian prisoners of war in World War II
World War II prisoners of war held by Germany
Norwegian prisoners sentenced to life imprisonment
Prisoners sentenced to life imprisonment by Norway
People convicted of treason for Nazi Germany against Norway